Unedogemmula ina is a species of sea snail, a marine gastropod mollusk in the family Turridae, the turrids.

Taxonomy
The species was transferred to Unedogemmula by Powell (1964). Later it was found alive and transferred to Lophiotoma by Li & Li (2008) who synonimized Unedogemmula with Lophiotoma.

Description
The length of the shell attains 40.2 mm.

Distribution
Fossils of this marine species were found in Miocene strata in Okinawa.

References

  Li B. [Baoquan] & Li X. [Xinzheng]. (2008). Report on the turrid genera Gemmula, Lophiotoma and Ptychosyrinx (Gastropoda: Turridae: Turrinae) from the China seas. Zootaxa. 1778: 1-25.

External links
 MacNeil, F. S. (1961 ["1960"). Tertiary and Quaternary Gastropoda of Okinawa. U. S. Geological Survey Professional Paper. 339: 1-148, plates 1-19]
  Powell, A.W.B. (1964). The family Turridae in the Indo-Pacific. Part 1. The subfamily Turrinae. Indo-Pacific Mollusca. 1 (5): 227-346; 1 (7): 409-454

ina
Gastropods described in 1961